John Haggitt Charles Patten, Baron Patten,  (born 17 July 1945) is a former Conservative Member of Parliament for Oxford West and Abingdon.

Early life
A Roman Catholic, he was educated by the Jesuits at Wimbledon College before graduating from Sidney Sussex College, Cambridge.

Parliamentary career
He was first elected for Oxford in 1979, transferring to Oxford West and Abingdon in 1983 after boundary changes divided the seat.  He stood down at the 1997 general election.  The seat was subsequently won by the Liberal Democrat Evan Harris.

Patten was offered the role as Secretary of State for Northern Ireland by Margaret Thatcher but refused.

Patten served as Secretary of State for Education from 1992 to 1994. He was interviewed at some length by Brian Sherratt in 1994 regarding his role as Secretary of State. While he was Education Secretary, Patten described Birmingham education chief Tim Brighouse as "a madman ... wandering the streets, frightening the children." Brighouse sued, and won substantial damages which were donated to educational charities.

House of Lords
Patten was created a life peer as Baron Patten of Wincanton in the County of Somerset on 17 June 1997.  In 2013, Patten voted against the Marriage (Same Sex Couples) Act 2013.

Family
He is married to the businesswoman Louise Patten and they have one daughter, Mary-Claire, married to Daniel Lloyd Johnson of Essex.

Other work
He was on the governing body of Abingdon School from 1983 to 1986. He has been a senior advisor to Charterhouse Capital Partners since 2001.

References

External links 
 

|-

|-

1945 births
Living people
People educated at Wimbledon College
Alumni of Sidney Sussex College, Cambridge
British Roman Catholics
British Secretaries of State
British Secretaries of State for Education
Conservative Party (UK) MPs for English constituencies
Conservative Party (UK) life peers
Members of the Privy Council of the United Kingdom
UK MPs 1979–1983
UK MPs 1983–1987
UK MPs 1987–1992
UK MPs 1992–1997
Northern Ireland Office junior ministers
Governors of Abingdon School
Life peers created by Elizabeth II